Santiago Sanz is a Paralympic athlete from Spain competing mainly in category T52 wheelchair racing events.

Santiago has competed in three Paralympics winning a total of four medals.  His first games in 2000 he won a silver in the 5000m and bronze in the 800m as well as competing in the 1500m.  He then competed in Athens for the 2004 Summer Paralympics where he again won a silver and bronze this time in the 1500m and 5000m respectively as well as again competing in the 800m.  In 2008 he competed in the 800m and marathon but failed to medal in either.

References

Paralympic athletes of Spain
Athletes (track and field) at the 2000 Summer Paralympics
Athletes (track and field) at the 2004 Summer Paralympics
Athletes (track and field) at the 2008 Summer Paralympics
Paralympic silver medalists for Spain
Paralympic bronze medalists for Spain
Living people
World record holders in Paralympic athletics
Medalists at the 2000 Summer Paralympics
Medalists at the 2004 Summer Paralympics
Year of birth missing (living people)
Paralympic medalists in athletics (track and field)
Spanish wheelchair racers